Schoenerupa is a genus of moths of the family Crambidae. It contains only one species, Schoenerupa thermantis, which is found in Ecuador.

References

External Links 
Natural History Museum Lepidoptera genus database

Erupini
Crambidae genera
Taxa named by George Hampson